Farmers Branch station (formerly Farmers Branch Park & Ride) is a DART Light Rail station in Farmers Branch, Texas. The station initially opened as a bus-only park & ride facility in the 1990s. Light rail platforms opened as part of the Green Line's expansion in December 2010.

References

External links
Dallas Area Rapid Transit - Farmers Branch Station

Dallas Area Rapid Transit light rail stations
Railway stations in the United States opened in 2010
Railway stations in Dallas County, Texas